Sophia Papamichalopoulou (born April 5, 1990) is an alpine skier who represented Cyprus at the 2010 Winter Olympics along with her brother Christopher. Sophia was Cyprus's flag bearer during the 2010 Winter Olympics closing ceremony.

Olympic Games

References 

Cypriot female alpine skiers
Olympic alpine skiers of Cyprus
Alpine skiers at the 2010 Winter Olympics
1990 births
Living people